Noé is a town in southeastern Ivory Coast. It is a sub-prefecture of Tiapoum Department in Sud-Comoé Region, Comoé District. One kilometre east of town is a border crossing with Ghana.

Noé was a commune until March 2012, when it became one of 1126 communes nationwide that were abolished. In 2014, the population of the sub-prefecture of Noé was 27,938.

Villages
The eight villages of the sub-prefecture of Noé and their population in 2014 were:
 Allakro  (3 870)
 Ehanian-Tanoé (997)
 Kadja-Gnanzoukro  (941)
 Kongodjan-Tanoé  (1 315)
 Noé  (9 411)
 Nougoua  (5 380)
 Saykro  (4 782)
 Yao Akakro  (1 242)

References

Sub-prefectures of Sud-Comoé
Ghana–Ivory Coast border crossings
Former communes of Ivory Coast